Elections to Newcastle-under-Lyme Borough Council were held on 1 May 2003.  One third of the council was up for election and the council stayed under no overall control.

After the election, the composition of the council was:
Labour 29
Liberal Democrat 18
Conservative 12
Caring Party 1

Election result

Ward results

References
2003 Newcastle-under-Lyme election result

2003
2003 English local elections
2000s in Staffordshire